Stijn Houben (born 5 April 1995) is a Dutch footballer who plays for Hoofdklasse club VOC as a central defender.

Club career
Houben started his career at HBS-Craeyenhout, one of the Netherlands' oldest clubs and at that time playing in the Topklasse, the third level of Dutch football. He made his senior debuts for the club in 2010, aged only 15, and shortly after moved to Feyenoord, eventually returning to the youth setup.

Houben was also called up three times by first team coach Ronald Koeman, and made his first team debut in a friendly against SBV Excelsior in October 2013. He was also an important defensive unit for the under-19's, winning both FA Cup and Supercup, against fierce rivals PSV Eindhoven.

In July 2014 Houben moved abroad for the first time of his career, signing a contract with Indian Super League outfit Delhi Dynamos FC. He played his first match as a professional on 1 November, starting and being booked in a 1–2 away loss against FC Goa.

In January 2015, Houben returned to HBS and resumed his studies in economics and business economics at Erasmus University Rotterdam. In 2017, he started playing for VOC.

Honours
Feyenoord
KNVB Cup U19: 2013–14
Johan Cruijff Shield U19: 2013–14

References

External links
Indian Super League profile

1995 births
Living people
Dutch footballers
Association football defenders
Odisha FC players
Dutch expatriate footballers
Dutch expatriate sportspeople in India
Expatriate footballers in India
Footballers from Maastricht
HBS Craeyenhout players
Vierde Divisie players
Feyenoord players
Indian Super League players
Erasmus University Rotterdam alumni